The Alvier is a mountain in the Appenzell Alps, located halfway between Lake Walenstadt and the Rhine in the canton of St. Gallen. It is one of the main summits of the chain separating the valleys of the river Seez and the Rhine.

Although involving a long hike, the summit is easily accessible by trails from both sides.

References

Mountains of the Alps
Mountains of Switzerland
Mountains of the canton of St. Gallen
Appenzell Alps